Strangers into Citizens was a political advocacy campaign from around February 2007 to May 2010 by the then Citizen Organising Foundation, also known as the London Citizens organisation, now defunct, having been merged into the Citizens UK organisation as separate local chapters. The campaign called for irregular and extraordinary (one-off and one-time-only) general amnesty, regularisation, naturalisation, and British citizenship for illegal immigrants in the United Kingdom. The campaign became defunct in 2013.

The campaign was founded by Austen Ivereigh, a former director of public affairs for the Archbishop of Westminster, Cardinal Cormac Murphy-O'Connor, and as such had strong links with amongst others the Cardinal Archbishop, Westminster Cathedral, the Catholic Bishops' Conference of England and Wales and the Catholic Herald newspaper, all three being supporters of the political advocacy campaign.

The campaign attempted to influence the policies of the political parties and candidates in both the 2008 London mayoral election and the 2010 general election in the United Kingdom During the London mayoral election, the campaign was supportively endorsed by the Liberal Democrats and the Labour and Conservative candidates for the Mayoralty of London in their personal capacity, being Ken Livingstone and Boris Johnson respectively.

Prelude
When it was launched in February 2007 with the backing of church leaders, trade unions, and migrant support groups, the campaign made rapid political progress, later counting the Conservative mayor of London and the Liberal-Democrat party among its principal advocates.

Background data
The Home Office calculated there to be at least 500,000 refused asylum-seekers and visa overstayers who have made new lives in the UK, and admits that most will never be expelled. But these estimates, based on 2001 figures, have been superseded by a study by the London School of Economics (LSE) which suggests that "the current population of irregular migrants and their children in the UK is somewhere in the range of 525,000 to 950,000 with a central estimate of 725,000". At current removal rates and costs, this means it would take 34 years and cost £8 billion forcibly to remove them all. Recently, a study carried out by the University of Oxford has estimated that there are 120,000 irregular migrant children in the UK, of whom 65,000 were born in the UK to parents without legal immigration status.

Strangers into Citizens argues that a proportion of these should become legal by means of a two-year work permit available to asylum-seekers or economic migrants who can show they have been in the UK for four years or more. The proposals put forward by the campaign would give indefinite leave to remain at the end of a two-year period, subject to criteria such as an English language test, a clean criminal record, and valid references from an employer and community sponsor for those qualifying for a work permit. Campaigners describe this as a "pathway to citizenship" of the sort advocated by President Barack Obama. In Europe, they point to the Spanish amnesty of 2005, in which 700,000 were granted legal status, as a possible model for the UK.

Endorsements
The campaign was inspired by a call by the Archbishop of Westminster Cardinal Cormac Murphy-O'Connor, who first raised the possibility at a Mass for Migrant Workers on 1 May 2006, organised by London Citizens. The Cardinal was moved to make the call following representations by Catholic priests concerned at the welfare of some of their congregants who either faced destitution or were paid less than the London Living Wage (LLW). London Citizens was also concerned that the LLW, for which they had long campaigned, was being undermined by employers exploiting illegal immigrants.

The Cardinal's call was taken up by faith leaders across the UK, as well as by the then Mayor of London, Ken Livingstone., trade unions, migrant and refugee organisations, as well as policy think tanks from all sides of the political spectrum, among them Compas and the Institute of Public Policy Research as well as politicians in both Houses of Parliament. In 2007 dozens of MPs in all the main parties signed an Early Day Motion in favour of the proposal.

Strangers into Citizens was supported by three out of six candidates for the deputy leadership of the Labour Party., including the winner of that contest, Harriet Harman, who is married to the campaign's leading trade union advocate Jack Dromey

A poll commissioned by the campaign shows most British people back the idea of giving status to those who have been living and working in the UK for many years.

Strangers into Citizens is supported by the major migrant NGOs in the UK (among them the Immigration Advisory Service, the Joint Council for the Welfare of Immigrants, Refugee Action, the Migrant Rights Network, the Jesuit Refugee Service, and the Churches' Refugee Forum).

The campaign's proposals have been supported by editorials in The Independent, The Tablet, and The Universe, and advocated in articles published in the Guardian, the Daily Telegraph, The Voice, the Observer, the Spectator, and the Evening Standard. The campaign has been strongly attacked in the Daily Express and the Sun.

Rally in Trafalgar Square, May 2007
On 7 May 2007, 15,000 people gathered in the rain in Trafalgar Square to call for regularisation. Among those addressing the Strangers into Citizens call were the (Catholic) Archbishop of Westminster, Cardinal Cormac Murphy-O'Connor; the (Anglican) Bishop of Southwark, Tom Butler; Dr. Mohammed Bari of the Muslim Council of Britain; Rabbi Shissler (representing the Chief Rabbi); Baroness Williams of Crosby; Jon Cruddas, the MP for Dagenham; Jack Dromey, deputy secretary-general of the TGWU; Dave Prentis, head of UNISON; the singer Billy Bragg; as well as the campaign's coordinator, Dr Austen Ivereigh.

On 20 June 2007, the proposal was debated in the House of Commons.

Progress of the campaign
In June 2006, the Institute for Public Policy Research applauded the apparent openness of Liam Byrne, the immigration minister, to the idea, following the Institute's study of the benefits of regularisation to the UK. IPPR calculated that £4.7 billion would be needed to be spent to deport all illegal residents, whereas the extra tax revenues from regularisation would result in a £1bn bonanza to the Exchequer in unpaid taxes.

By regularizing the most eligible, IPPR argued, the enforcement effort on the remainder can be reduced by at least half, perhaps even by as much as three-quarters or more. Currently, the Home Office repatriates up to 25,000 illegal immigrants a year and has openly admitted it does not have the resources to remove all illegals in the country.

On 19 February 2007, the immigration minister rejected the idea, saying "it would act as a pull factor in drawing illegal immigrants to this country."
However, a Spanish expert on the issue told the BBC Today Programme on 7 May that the Spanish regularisation of 700,000 migrants in 2005 had reduced the number of illegal immigrants.

A Council of Europe report in February 2007 argues that regularisation should be seen as part of a package of immigration reforms that reduce illegal immigration. Through measures that aim to crack down on the informal economy, cut down on impractical bureaucracy, and give immigrants a legal option for admission, Spain hopes to better control unauthorised immigration. A BBC report in June 2006 found that the Spanish regularisation had been a success and that most Spaniards believed it had worked. Strangers into Citizens believes the Spanish model could provide a way forward for the UK.

Endorsement by the Liberal Democrats
The campaign scored its first major success in August 2007, when following meetings with campaigners the Liberal Democrats announced it would consider adopting the proposal at its party conference. Its immigration minister, Nick Clegg MP, argued in The Observer that "a route of earned legalisation should be made available to those who have lived here unauthorised for many years", and promised to "set stringent criteria – this is not a blanket amnesty". Among the criteria were
 that the applicant should have lived in the UK for many years;
 should have a clean criminal record; and
  should show a long-term commitment to the UK.
Clegg also said the applicant would be subject to a public interest test and an English language and civics test and would be required to pay a charge.

"Frankly this is just in recognition of the fact that, because of incompetence or mismanagement in the immigration system over many years, we have very large numbers of people who live in this twilight world of illegality and – in many cases – exploitation in the workplace which we need to deal with," Mr. Clegg told BBC Radio 4's Today programme.

The Government repeated its opposition to the idea, while the Conservative Party's David Davis attacked the idea as "irresponsible": "on the one hand it will encourage people to come here illegally as well as being unfair to those who have obeyed the law and tried to enter the UK legally.".

On 18 September 2007, the Liberal-Democrats adopted the idea of "an earned route to citizenship" with 10 years' residence conditions. Although the residence requirement was too strict, Strangers into Citizens campaigners said they were "delighted that a major political party has adopted a specific policy of regularisation".

At the Labour Party conference in Bournemouth on 24 September 2007, Jon Cruddas, the leading parliamentary advocate of the campaign, criticised immigration minister Liam Byrne's objections. "There's a fork in the road on this issue", he said at a fringe meeting organised by the Immigration Advisory Service and Strangers into Citizens campaign.

London mayoral candidates' endorsement, 2008
A major advance for the campaign came in the run-up to the London mayoral election on 1 May 2008. At a public assembly organised by London Citizens  on 9 April 2008, the four leading mayoral candidates all agreed to brand London a "Strangers into Citizens" capital and to throw their weight behind the campaign.

The backing of the Labour and Conservative candidates was in defiance of their national party policies. Quizzed about Boris Johnson's stance in advance of the assembly, the Conservative Party leader, David Cameron, disagreed with him but acknowledged that he was not bound by central party policy.

At the Assembly itself, Johnson expressed pride in his Muslim immigrant ancestry, saying that his Turkish great-grandfather who had fled from Turkey would be proud to have a descendant standing for mayor.

"If an immigrant has been here for a long time and there is no realistic prospect of returning them, then I do think that person's condition should be regularised so that they can pay taxes and join the rest of society," Boris Johnson told the 2,500-strong assembly.

Despite a Sunday Times report after the election the mayor had "quietly dropped" his commitment, Johnson has since become the campaign's highest-profile advocate.

Endorsement by the Catholic bishops of England and Wales
In March 2007, Vincent Nichols, the then Archbishop of Birmingham, added his support for the campaign proposals at a Birmingham Citizens assembly.

In April 2008, the Catholic bishops of England and Wales issued a major policy document, "Mission of the Church to migrants in England and Wales", which included a call for regularisation, without specifying conditions. Noting that "many [undocumented] migrants have been here for several years; some have even set down roots and started families", the bishops said:

"Without condoning illegal immigration, the Church's position on this, as in other fields of human endeavour, does not allow economic, social, and political calculations to prevail over the person, but on the contrary, for the dignity of the human person to be put above everything else, and the rest to be conditioned by it. The Church will continue to advocate compassion to allow the 'undocumented' an opportunity to acquire proper status so that they can continue to contribute to the common good without the constant fear of discovery and removal."

Speaking at the third Mass for Migrant Workers at Westminster Cathedral in London, on 5 May 2008, the Bishop of Brentwood, Thomas McMahon, pledged support for Strangers into Citizens and described as "shameful" and "unjust" the Government's failure to regularise the position of thousands of long-term illegal immigrants in Britain.

The bishop called on Catholics to remain "resolute" and "steadfast" in backing the campaign proposal.

"For any Government to choose to do nothing about regularisation is irresponsible and leaves countless migrants vulnerable to exploitation and living in fear and in limbo," Bishop McMahon told the congregation. "They cannot work, they cannot claim benefits, they cannot get public housing. I can only describe it as shameful and unjust."

The bishop added that there would be another rally in Trafalgar Square on May Bank Holiday in 2009 "to demonstrate to the Government that this issue has not gone away".

An idea gaining momentum?
Starting in 2007, the UK Border Agency (formerly the Border and Immigration Agency and, previously, the Immigration and Nationality Directorate of the Home Office) began an attempt to clear the backlog of unresolved asylum cases. Although not officially an amnesty but a 'case resolution exercise', this has led to several asylum-seeking families whose applications had been refused being granted Indefinite Leave to Remain in the UK.

Because this legal recognition was given based on their "long association with the UK", according to the wording of the letters that these families have received, it has obvious points in common with the Strangers into Citizens campaign, and may well have been influenced by it.

In July 2008, the liberal policy think tank Centre Forum published a policy paper whose title – "Earned amnesty: bringing illegal workers out of the shadows"—borrowed heavily from the Strangers into Citizens campaign's language and concepts. But while many of the arguments were the same, Centre Forum proposed that immigrants pay their way into British citizenship, spending £5,000 over a period of years, and requiring a residence of just three months.

In September 2008 The Independent reported that Anthony Browne, director of the Conservative policy thinktank Policy Exchange who is soon to start as the Mayor of London's policy director, would be releasing a policy document favouring regularisation. In a comment piece in the newspaper, Browne argued for a "permanent earned amnesty for those who have been in the country a long time", halving the current long residency concession of 14 to seven years before reducing it still further.

The new Labour Immigration Minister Phil Woolas told The Times that "An amnesty... starts with a discussion among politicians and ends with dead bodies in the back of a truck in Calais."

Boris gives explicit support
In October 2008, the London Assembly passed a motion backing the Mayor's support for an amnesty for long-term migrants and called on the Government to implement it.

The following month, London's Conservative mayor, Boris Johnson, gave an interview to Channel 4 News endorsing the idea in terms almost identical to the Strangers into Citizens proposals. He said the expulsion of London's 400,000 illegal immigrants was "just not going to happen". While he was powerless to change national policy on the issue, Johnson said he wanted to "lead the debate" by commissioning a study into the feasibility of the idea. He said he favoured the idea of an "earned amnesty", whereby after a period of about five years individuals could "show their commitment to this society and to this economy" to earn the right to stay. "We want to look in detail at what the economic impact of such an earned amnesty system would be," he said.

Cardinal Murphy-O'Connor repeated his support for the idea, backing mayor Boris on the BBC Sunday programme.

In November 2008 the mayor announced he had commissioned a study from the London School of Economics.

On 9 March 2009, a BBC Panorama programme included some findings from the LSE's interim report which showed that the undocumented population of the UK had increased to around 725,000 and that it would take 34 years and cost £8bn forcibly to remove them. The report estimated that around 70% of the UK total lived in London and that 450,000 would be regularised under the mayor's proposal.

Strangers into Citizens welcomed the revised figures as more realistic. "We have consistently said that the Home Office figures were too low and that 700–800,000 was more realistic, said its policy director, Dr. Austen Ivereigh. "We welcome confirmation of the reality by a leading research institution. We can now have a more realistic discussion about what to do."

"If it was completely impossible back then to claim that deportation was a solution, it is even more impossible in the light of the new figures," he added.

The mayor told 'Panorama': "If it does look as though they could make a contribution to society, we should regularise their status or offer them the chance of regularising their status. There would be some very tough criteria. Obviously no criminal record would be one, an ability to support yourself and support your family, commitment to society and the most important thing is they should have been here for a considerable period of time."

Mr. Johnson said it was a "hard political argument to win" but added: "If people are going to be here and we've chronically failed to kick them out it's morally right that they should contribute in their taxes to the rest of society."

BBC Panorama examines the issue
"Immigration – time for an amnesty?", examined the mayor's proposal, but without referring to the Strangers into Citizens campaign which had led to it.

It featured profiles of undocumented migrants, including a Brazilian mother of two who came to the UK seven years ago with the specific intention of overstaying her visitor's visa. She earned £8 an hour cleaning people's houses – all cash in hand, no taxes. If she were regularised and allowed to pay tax, she would contribute to the economy but would get access to benefits such as healthcare and education. In Maria's case, it would mean that her five-year-old son, who was born in the UK, could go to school instead of accompanying her on a cleaning job; at present, the boy is missing out on his education because Maria is worried they would get deported if her illegal status is discovered.

The programme also profiled Maria's eldest son, born in Brazil, who came over on a student visa that expired three years earlier. He worked as a washer of dishes in a restaurant kitchen 60 hours a week, earning less than the minimum wage. Because he is illegal, he can do nothing about it.

The programme also examined the case of a 28-year-old Bangladeshi teacher, Farhan Zakaria, who has been in the UK for 12 years and considers himself British. He had become illegal without knowing it when his father lost his job at the High Commission. The school where he taught French was forced to sack him; replacing him had proved difficult and costly.

Panorama included comments by Phil Woolas, the immigration minister, and Sir Andrew Green of MigrationWatch, who repeated their opposition to the idea.

The LSE study: interim findings
In March 2009 the LSE published the interim findings of a report commissioned by the Greater London Authority (GLA) to explore the proposition of an earned regularisation scheme.

It noted three categories of irregular migrants: 
 illegal entrants – those who evade formal migration controls and present false papers (the minority); 
 migrants who entered legally and have been lawfully present in the UK but who remain after the end of the agreed period (the overwhelming majority);
 children born in the UK to irregular migrants, who are not migrants themselves but have no right to remain.

The second category, into which the majority falls, includes two main subcategories: 
  failed asylum seekers who stay in the UK despite a final decision refusing them the right to remain, and, 
  overstayers whose period of legal residency has expired without renewal.  This second group also includes those who are no longer eligible to stay because the Government introduced a points system.

The report noted that eligibility for regularisation programmes varies greatly between countries and that proportions of the irregular population accepted for such programmes were mostly in the range of 60 to 90%.

A "very preliminary note" on the costs of regularisation noted that there were costs associated with regularisation which arose from the increased use of services (schools, education, health, housing, welfare benefits, etc.). But the LSE noted that the extent of use would vary widely and in some cases make little or no impact. The report also observes that there are economic benefits from reducing the size of irregularity which have not yet been addressed.

References

Sources 
 , Strangers into Citizens campaign website
, Campaign video
 , Friction TV debate
 , TrueTube debate between Dr Austen Ivereigh (Strangers into Citizens campaign) and Sir Andrew Green (MigrationWatch)

London mayoral candidates back campaign, April 2008
 Mayoral candidates unite in call for illegal immigration amnesty, The Independent (9 April 2008)
 Calls grow for immigrant amnesty,The Independent (10 April 2008)
 BBC 
 The Guardian 

Rally in Trafalgar Square, 7 May 2007:
BBC , Reuters , Channel 4 News 

News reports
  Illegal migrants' right to work finds support in poll, The Independent (25 April 2007)
 Rally to urge fairer deal for illegal immigrants, The Guardian (7 May 2007)
  Campaign to regularize undocumented immigrants gathers pace in Britain, Voice of Africa (7 May 2007)
 A model immigrant, betrayed by Britain, The Independent (6 September 2007)
 Most Spaniards think amnesty worked, BBC (14 June 2006)
  Lib-Dems in immigration amnesty plans, Press Association (18 September 2007)
 Illegal immigrants 'should be offered an amnesty to become British', The Times (18 September 2007)
 Lib Dems follow church calls for migrant amnesty, Ekklesia (19 September 2007)
 Minister attacked in migrant row, BBC Online, 24 September 2007
 Jon Cruddas throws down challenge on party reform and immigration, The Times (24 September 2007)
 'Mayor wants amnesty for illegal immigrants', Evening Standard (9 March 2009)

Newspaper/magazine articles and editorials favouring Strangers into Citizens
(2006)
 Madeleine Bunting: 'A modern-day slavery is flourishing, and we just avert our eyes', The Guardian (18 December 2006)
(2007)
 Austen Ivereigh: 'Let's sort out the immigration mess', The Spectator (17 March 2007)
  Austen Ivereigh: letter in response to Frank Field MP, The Spectator (31 March 2007)
  'A sensible proposal to break this vicious circle'(editorial), The Independent (25 April 2007)
  Austen Ivereigh: 'Plight of the shadow people', The Tablet (28 April 2007)
 Polly Toynbee: 'Phoney policies only backfire. We need an amnesty for illegal immigrants', The Guardian (4 May 2007)
 Austen Ivereigh: 'Out of the Shadows', The Guardian (4 May 2007)
, Neal Lawson: 'Making Everyone a Winner', The Guardian (8 May 2007)
 Nick Cohen: 'Let Britain's secret migrant societies emerge into the light', The Observer (3 June 2007)
  Philip Johnston: 'The immigration horse has bolted', Daily Telegraph (25 June 2007)
 Austen Ivereigh: True British citizens in all but name, The Independent (6 September 2007)
 Jasper Gerard: The truth MigrationWatch doesn't want you to know, The Observer (23 September 2007)
 Mary Riddell: What about a welcome amid the warnings, chief constable? The Observer (23 September 2007)
 John Harris: 'Britishness isn't working', Guardian online (25 September 2007)
(2008)
, Brian Paddick: 'It's time to move hardworking illegals into society', The Independent (9 April 2008)
, Roman Ngouabeu, 'Let me escape from this terrifying limbo', The Independent (10 April 2008)
 Will Somerville: 'Safety First', The Guardian (23 July 2008)
 Anthony Browne: Why we should grant illegal immigrants an amnesty, The Independent (26 September 2008)
 Austen Ivereigh, 'Strangers no longer', Thinking Faith (22 December 2008)

2009
 Simon Jenkins: 'Immigrants are good for us. Let them stay—and pay their taxes', Evening Standard (10 March 2009)
 'Boris Johnson wants illegal immigrants to pay their way', Daily Telegraph (11 March 2009)

News reports  / articles opposing Strangers into Citizens
 'Migrant plan a disaster', Daily Express (8 May 2007)
   Andrew Green, 'This would make a bad situation worse', the Daily Telegraph (10 May 2007)
 'Migrant amnesty just won't work', Evening Standard (9 March 2009)

Support from the Catholic Church:
'Bishop attacks immigration policy', "The Independent" (6 May 2008)
  "Mission of the Church to the migrants in England and Wales"
  'Some illegal immigrants deserve to stay, argue bishops', "The Catholic Herald" (18 April 2008)
 Ed Vulliamy: Welcome to the new holy land, The Observer (17 December 2006)
  US Catholic campaign for immigration reform

Policy papers favouring regularisation:
 Institute of Public Policy Research (IPPR)
  Jount Council for the Welfare of Immigrants (JCWI)
  Centre Forum

Political advocacy groups in the United Kingdom
Immigration to the United Kingdom